Jeon Dae-heung (born 26 July 1976) is a South Korean cyclist. He competed in the men's team pursuit at the 1996 Summer Olympics.

References

1976 births
Living people
South Korean male cyclists
Olympic cyclists of South Korea
Cyclists at the 1996 Summer Olympics
Place of birth missing (living people)
Cyclists at the 1998 Asian Games
Cyclists at the 2002 Asian Games
Asian Games competitors for South Korea
20th-century South Korean people